Museum Tower Charlotte is a 43-story apartment building in Uptown Charlotte, North Carolina. The building is 455 ft. (139 m) tall and includes 394 units.

Construction began on May 1, 2015, Museum Tower is the 5th residential building to begin construction in Uptown Charlotte since the end of the Great Recession.

Museum Tower Charlotte was constructed over the Mint Museum Charlotte. It opened on June 16, 2017, 7 years after the opening of the Duke Energy Center next door.

References

Residential skyscrapers in Charlotte, North Carolina
Residential buildings completed in 2017